The SVB Derde Divisie is an annual football tournament organized by the Surinamese Football Association (SVB) since 2006. It is also known as the SURIBET Lidbondentoernooi due to sponsorship. The tournament is contested by the winners and runners-up of the districts leagues from the 20 regional member associations of the SVB. The winner and runner-up of the tournament can then qualify for the SVB Eerste Klasse, the 2nd tier of football in Suriname. In 2017, the competition was rebranded as the SVB Derde Divisie.

History 
Until 2006 there were two tournaments, the "Randdistrictentoernooi" (1973-2005) for the ten member associations in and around the capital city Paramaribo, where the champion and runner-up each member association participated, and the "Inter-districtentoernooi" (1979-2005) which served as the inter district tournament for the other member associations of the SVB. In 2006 the two tournaments were fused together to create a more equal playing field. The winners and runners-up of the new tournament are then considered for promotion to the Eerste Klasse and on a few occasions have even been promoted directly to the Hoofdklasse, the top flight of football in Suriname.

Lidbondentoernooi

Randdistrictentoernooi

Inter-districtentoernooi

References

 

3
2006 establishments in Suriname
Sports leagues established in 2006